The 1992–93 SK Rapid Wien season is the 95th season in club history.

Squad statistics

Fixtures and results

Bundesliga

Cup

UEFA Cup

References

1992-93 Rapid Wien Season
Austrian football clubs 1992–93 season